The Franko Escarpment is a mostly snow-covered escarpment that runs north–south for  and forms the northeast edge of Lexington Table in the Forrestal Range of the Pensacola Mountains, Antarctica. It was named by the Advisory Committee on Antarctic Names in 1979 for Stephen J. Franko, a Grants and Contracts Officer with the National Science Foundation from 1967, with responsibility for all contracts in support of the United States Antarctic Research Program.

References

Escarpments of Queen Elizabeth Land